Robert Deurwaerder (born 19 September 1941) is a Belgian footballer. He played in one match for the Belgium national football team in 1963.

References

External links
 

1941 births
Living people
Belgian footballers
Belgium international footballers
Place of birth missing (living people)
Association football midfielders